Dairy products or milk products, also known as lacticinia, are food products made from (or containing) milk. The most common dairy animals are cow, water buffalo, nanny goat, and ewe. Dairy products include common grocery store food items in the Western world such as yogurt, cheese and butter. A facility that produces dairy products is known as a dairy. Dairy products are consumed worldwide to varying degrees (see consumption patterns worldwide). Some people avoid some or all dairy products either because of lactose intolerance, veganism, or other health reasons or beliefs.

Production relationship graph

Types of dairy product

Milk 

Milk is produced after optional homogenization or pasteurization, in several grades after standardization of the fat level, and possible addition of the bacteria Streptococcus lactis and Leuconostoc citrovorum. Milk can be broken down into several different categories based on type of product produced, including cream, butter, cheese, infant formula, and yogurt.

Milk varies in fat content. Skim milk is milk with zero fat, while whole milk products contain fat.

Milk is an ingredient in many confectioneries. Milk can be added to chocolate to produce milk chocolate.

Cream

Butter 

Butter, mostly milk fat, produced by churning cream

 Ghee also called, clarified butter, by gentle heating of butter and removal of the solid matter
Smen, a fermented, clarified butter used in Moroccan cooking
Anhydrous milkfat (clarified butter)

Fermented 

Fermented milk products include:

Yogurt 

Yogurt, milk fermented by thermophilic bacteria, mainly Streptococcus salivarius ssp. thermophilus and Lactobacillus delbrueckii ssp. bulgaricus sometimes with additional bacteria, such as Lactobacillus acidophilus

Cheese 

Cheese, produced by coagulating milk, separating curds from whey, and letting it ripen, generally with bacteria, and sometimes also with certain molds.

Custard 

 Custard, thickened with eggs
 Imitation custard, thickened with starch

Frozen 

Ice cream, slowly frozen cream, milk, flavors and emulsifying additives (dairy ice cream)
Gelato, slowly frozen milk and water, lesser fat than ice cream
Ice milk, low-fat version of ice cream
Frozen custard
Frozen yogurt, yogurt with emulsifiers

Casein

Consumption patterns worldwide 

Rates of dairy consumption vary widely worldwide. These countries are: Argentina, Armenia, Australia, Costa Rica, most European countries, Israel, Kyrgyzstan, North America and Pakistan. Medium-consumption countries consume  to 150 kg per capita per year. These countries are: India, Iran, Japan, Kenya, Mexico, Mongolia, New Zealand, North and Southern Africa, most of the Middle East, and most of Latin America and the Caribbean. Low-consumption countries consume under 30 kg per capita per year. These countries are: Senegal, most of Central Africa, and most of East and Southeast Asia.

Lactose levels 

For those with some degree of lactose intolerance, considering the amount of lactose in dairy products can be important to health.

Intolerance and health research 

Dairy products may upset the digestive system in individuals with lactose intolerance or a milk allergy. People who experience lactose intolerance usually avoid milk and other lactose-containing dairy products, which may cause mild side effects, such as abdominal pain, bloating, diarrhea, gas, and nausea. Such individuals may use non-dairy milk substitutes.

Cancer

The American Institute for Cancer Research (AICR), World Cancer Research Fund International (WCRF), Cancer Council Australia (CCA) and Cancer Research UK have stated that there is strong evidence that consumption of dairy products decreases risk of colorectal cancer. The AICR, WCRF, CCA and Prostate Cancer UK have stated that there is limited but suggestive evidence that dairy products increase risk of prostate cancer. The American Cancer Society (ACS) have stated that because dairy products "may lower the risk of some cancers and possibly increase the risk of others, the ACS does not make specific recommendations on dairy food consumption for cancer prevention."

It has been suggested that consumption of insulin-like growth factor 1 (IGF-1) in dairy products could increase cancer risk, particularly prostate cancer. However, a 2018 review by the  Committee on Carcinogenicity of Chemicals in Food, Consumer Products and the Environment (COC) concluded that there is "insufficient evidence to draw any firm conclusions as to whether exposure to dietary IGF-1 is associated with an increased incidence of cancer in consumers". The COC also stated it is unlikely that there would be absorption of intact IGF-1 from food by most consumers.

A 2019 review concluded that higher-quality research was needed to characterise valid associations between dairy consumption and risk of and/or cancer-related mortality. A 2021 umbrella review found strong evidence that consumption of dairy products decreases risk of colorectal cancer. Fermented dairy is associated with significantly decreased bladder cancer and colorectal cancer risk.

Other

Consumption of dairy products such as low-fat and whole milk have been associated with an increased acne risk, however, as of 2022 there is no conclusive evidence. Fermented and low-fat dairy products are associated with a decreased risk of diabetes. Consumption of dairy products are also associated with a decreased risk of gout.

Avoidance on principle 

Some groups avoid dairy products for non-health-related reasons. Some religions restrict or do not allow the consumption of dairy products. For example, some scholars of Jainism advocate not consuming any dairy products because dairy is perceived to involve violence against cows. Orthodox Judaism requires that meat and dairy products not be served at the same meal, served or cooked in the same utensils, or stored together, as prescribed in Deuteronomy 14:21.

Veganism is the avoidance of all animal products, including dairy products, most often due to the ethics regarding how dairy products are produced. The ethical reasons for avoiding meat and dairy products include how dairy is produced, how the animals are handled, and the environmental effect of dairy production. According to a report of the United Nations' Food and Agriculture Organization in 2010 the dairy sector accounted for 4 percent of global man-made greenhouse gas emissions.

See also 

 List of dairy products
 List of dairy product companies in the United States
 Dairy industry in the United States
 Dairy industry in the United Kingdom
 Swiss cheeses and dairy products

References and notes

Notes

References

Further reading 

 Fuquay, John W. ed. Encyclopedia of Dairy Sciences (2nd Edition, 4 vol 2011), comprehensive coverage.
Rankin, H. F. (1922) Imbucase: the Story of the B. C. I. C. of the Ministry of Food. Edinburgh: Edinburgh Press (B.C.I.C.=Butter and Cheese Imports Committee).